Whitbourne is a town on the Avalon Peninsula in Newfoundland and Labrador, Canada in Division 1.

History
Whitbourne, Newfoundland's first inland town, is named after Sir Richard Whitbourne, one of the most colourful early settlers of Newfoundland and Labrador who wrote a book about Newfoundland that was published in 1620. Sir Richard was appointed by the High Court of the Admiralty to set up the first English law court in the New World in 1615 in Trinity. He was kidnapped and held by the notorious Pirate Peter Easton in Harbour Grace. He also described a mermaid that he saw in St. John's harbour. Later, he became governor of Renews on the Southern Shore.

Whitbourne, unlike most communities on the Island of Newfoundland is inland.  It was founded in about 1880 during the construction of the Newfoundland Railway. The railway continued to be an important employer in the Town until its abandonment in 1988, although its economic significance declined gradually throughout the twentieth century.

Sir Robert Bond, the prime minister from 1900 to 1909, played a role in the expansion and planning of the Town and developed an elaborate country home, the "Grange", there. The house is no longer in existence, but part of the estate is now Sir Robert Bond Park, which is noted for an unusual abundance of northern lichens including the relatively rare Degelia plumbea or blue felt lichen Degelia.

Present day
The town of Whitbourne is located just off the Trans-Canada Highway on Route 81. It is located at the centre of three possible routes to visit the Avalon Peninsula. Route 80 is one of the two entrances to the Baccalieu Trail, Route 100 and Route 81 lead to the Marine Atlantic Ferry Service in Argentia and other parts of Placentia and St. Mary's Bays, and Route 1, the Trans Canada leads towards the second entrance to the Baccalieu Trail and the capital city of St. John's. As a result, there is a Provincial Visitor Information Centre on the Trans Canada near the town.

Whitbourne has many of the amenities of a small town that has traditionally been a regional service centre. The town's Wetlands Conservation Trail is of interest to many visitors.

Demographics 

Notable people
Shannon Tweed

See also
 Long Harbour Nickel Processing Plant
 List of cities and towns in Newfoundland and Labrador

References 

 Towns of Trinity Bay The Baccalieu Trail Tourism Association, with permission from Webmaster.

Towns in Newfoundland and Labrador